Kazuki Sado (佐渡一毅, born 20 February 1985) is a Japanese dressage rider. He competed at the 2018 World Equestrian Games, at the Asian Games in 2014 and 2018. He won team gold during the Asian Games in 2018 and team silver during the Asian Games in 2014. He trained in the Netherlands with former Olympian Imke Schellekens-Bartels in preparation towards the 2020 Olympic Games. He participated in the 2020 Olympics.

References

1985 births
Living people
Japanese male equestrians
Japanese dressage riders
Sportspeople from Kyoto
Equestrians at the 2014 Asian Games
Equestrians at the 2018 Asian Games
Equestrians at the 2020 Summer Olympics
Olympic equestrians of Japan
Medalists at the 2014 Asian Games
Medalists at the 2018 Asian Games
Asian Games gold medalists for Japan
Asian Games silver medalists for Japan
Asian Games medalists in equestrian